Enid Derham (24 March 1882 – 13 November 1941, age 59) was an Australian poet and academic.

Life
Derham was born in Hawthorn, Melbourne, Victoria, the eldest daughter of Thomas Plumley Derham, solicitor, and his wife Ellen Hyde, née Hodgson, of Melbourne. Derham was educated at Hessle College, Camberwell, then at Presbyterian Ladies' College and the University of Melbourne. She graduated M.A. with first class final honours in classics in 1903, was awarded the Shakespeare scholarship in 1904 and subsequently studied at Oxford University. In 1912 Derham was one of the founding members of the Lyceum Club and its president in 1918.

Derham lectured in English at the University of Western Australia in 1921 and was appointed senior lecturer in English at the University of Melbourne in 1922, and held this position for the rest of her life. She died suddenly of a brain haemorrhage at her home in 1941.

Writing career
In 1912 she published The Mountain Road and Other Verses, and Empire: A Morality Play for Children. She also edited books of prose, poetry and drama. In a review for The Herald, Archibald Strong compared her work favourably with that of Louis Esson, Dorothea Mackellar and Christopher Brennan. He wrote of the "true and original singing quality and its scholarly and critical finish" as being rare in Australian poetry and noted that her poem "Cras Nobis" was "easily the best Australian contribution" to the Australasian Students' Song Book, published in 1911 by George Robertson.

Melbourne University Press released a posthumous anthology of her best work called Poems in 1958 which re-established her reputation as a poet.

While her poetry was influenced by her classical studies, she was one of the earliest Australian writers to recognise the poetry of Emily Dickinson.

References

1882 births
1941 deaths
Australian women poets
University of Melbourne alumni
People educated at the Presbyterian Ladies' College, Melbourne
20th-century Australian poets
20th-century Australian women writers
19th-century Australian women